BOA (an abbreviation for Bitch on Arrival) is the stage name of Ryan Boa, a drag performer most known for competing on season 1 of Canada's Drag Race.

Early life
Boa was born in Windsor, Ontario.

Career
BOA worked as a drag queen for six years before competing on season 1 of Canada's Drag Race, where he placed seventh.

In May 2015, BOA was physically attacked after a show by a man he had brought home to hang out with following a performance, after the attacker pressured BOA to have sex and BOA declined. The attacker broke BOA's nose, and stole his wallet, laptop and cellphone. He was arrested two weeks later in Vancouver, British Columbia, following another unrelated crime, and was identified as BOA's attacker; in September 2016 he pled guilty to the robbery and a breach of probation charge from prior crimes, although the physical assault charge was dropped.

BOA has since continued to speak out about the issue of violence in the LGBTQ+ community, including speaking about the incident in a Canada's Drag Race episode.

In 2021, she released the debut single "Gettin' It Done". 
In July 2021, she performed alongside Juice Boxx, Anastarzia Anaquway, Farra N. Hyte and TroyBoy at the inaugural Drag Starz at the Manor, a new drag event in Guelph, Ontario.

Personal life
Boa lives in Toronto. He proposed to his boyfriend in 2020.

Discography

Singles
 "Gettin' It Done"

Filmography

Television
 Canada's Drag Race (season 1)

References

Year of birth missing (living people)
Living people
21st-century Canadian LGBT people
Canada's Drag Race contestants
Canadian drag queens
People from Toronto
People from Windsor, Ontario